Bryoamaride is a chemical compound isolated from certain plants, notably Bryonia dioica.  It can be seen as a derivative of the triterpene hydrocarbon cucurbitane, more specifically from cucurbitacin L or 23,24-dihydrocucurbitacin I.<ref name=ChenRev>Jian Chao Chen, Ming Hua Chiu, Rui Lin Nie, Geoffrey A. Cordell and Samuel X. Qiu (2005), "Cucurbitacins and cucurbitane glycosides: structures and biological activities" Natural Product Reports, volume 22, pages 386-399 </ref>

The derivative 25-O-acetylbryoamaride is found in Trichosanthes tricuspidata''.

References 

Triterpenes
Glucosides